The 2018–19 Nevada Wolf Pack men's basketball team represented the University of Nevada, Reno during the 2018–19 NCAA Division I men's basketball season. The Wolf Pack, led by fourth-year head coach Eric Musselman, played their home games at the Lawlor Events Center on their campus in Reno, Nevada as members of the Mountain West Conference (MW). They finished the season 29–5, 15–3 in Mountain West play to share the regular season Mountain West championship with Utah State. They defeated Boise State in the quarterfinals of the Mountain West tournament before losing in the semifinals to San Diego State. They received an at-large bid to the NCAA tournament where they lost in the first round to Florida.

On April 7, head coach Eric Musselman resigned to become the head coach at Arkansas. He finished at Nevada with a four-year record of 110–34, three trips to the NCAA Tournament, and were champions of the 2016 College Basketball Invitational.

On April 11, Nevada hired Steve Alford as their next head coach.

Previous season
The Wolf Pack finished the season 29–8 overall and 15–3 in conference play to win the MW regular season championship. They defeated UNLV in the quarterfinals of the MW tournament before losing in the semifinals to San Diego State. They received an at-large bid to the NCAA tournament where they defeated Texas and Cincinnati to advance to the Sweet Sixteen where they lost to Loyola–Chicago.

Offseason

Departures

Incoming transfers

2018 recruiting class

2019 recruiting class

Preseason
According to ESPN journalist Jeff Borzello, this season's Wolf Pack team "has high-level talent throughout its roster", later adding, "There might not be a team in the country with more college-proven depth than Nevada." The team returns three players who earned all-conference recognition last season—first-team members Jordan Caroline and Caleb Martin and second-team member Cody Martin, with Caleb Martin also having been named Player of the Year by MW coaches. Additionally, six transfers who averaged at least 13 points per game in their immediately previous seasons of college play will become eligible this season.

At the conference's media days in Las Vegas, Caroline and the Martin twins were named as preseason first-team all-conference picks for 2018–19, with Caleb Martin picked as the preseason Player of the Year. Jordan Brown, who headed the Pack's 2018 recruiting class, was named preseason Freshman of the Year. The Pack were also the overwhelming choice for the MW regular-season title, receiving all but one of the possible first-place votes.

Roster

Schedule and results

|-
!colspan=9 style=| Exhibition

|-
!colspan=9 style=| Non-conference regular season

|-
!colspan=9 style=| Mountain West regular season

|-
!colspan=9 style=| Mountain West tournament

|-
!colspan=9 style=|NCAA tournament

Rankings

*AP does not release post-NCAA Tournament rankings^Coaches did not release a Week 2 poll.

References

Nevada Wolf Pack men's basketball seasons
Nevada
Nevada Wolf Pack
Nevada Wolf Pack
Nevada